Moraea gigandra is a species of plant in the family Iridaceae. It is found in South Africa.

References

External links

gigandra
Endemic flora of South Africa
Flora of the Cape Provinces
Renosterveld
Taxa named by Louisa Bolus